Isetsima Blaise Nkufo (born 25 May 1975) is a Swiss former international footballer who played as a striker and current coach of Rino's Tigers in the Vancouver Metro Soccer League.

He was born in Zaire and raised in Switzerland from the age of seven. Nkufo played professionally in Switzerland, Qatar, Germany, the Netherlands, and the United States, scoring 209 goals in 442 career league appearances. Nkufo was also a member of the Switzerland national team, having won 34 caps and scored seven goals. He played for them at the 2010 World Cup.

Club career 
Nkufo played for Lausanne Sport, FC Echallens, Al-Arabi, Yverdon-Sport FC, Grasshopper Club Zürich, AC Lugano, FC Lucerne, Mainz 05, Hannover 96, FC Twente and Seattle Sounders FC.

In early 2010, Nkufo left Twente and was linked to sign with the Major League Soccer team Seattle Sounders FC. On 4 March 2010, the Sounders confirmed that they had signed Nkufo and that he would be joining the Sounders' squad on 13 July 2010 when his contract with Twente expired. In his final season with Twente, Nkufo scored 12 Eredivisie goals helping the club to their first league title in their 45-year history. Nkufo made 223 Eredivisie appearances for Twente, and scored 114 goals - a club record. Twente erected a statue in his honour outside of the stadium following his departure.

His first appearance for the Sounders was on 18 July 2010 during a friendly vs. Celtic. Nkufo was the first Sounders player to record a hat-trick in league play, doing so against the Columbus Crew on 18 September 2010. It ended a scoreless drought of 415 minutes for him after joining the club. On 5 October 2010, Nkufo featured in the final of the U.S. Open Cup as the Sounders defeated the Columbus Crew by a score of 2–1. On 15 March 2011, Seattle and Nkufo agreed mutually to the termination of his deal. Nkufo announced his retirement thirteen days later.

International career 
Nkufo made his international debut for Switzerland in 2000. He was a squad member at the 2010 World Cup in South Africa. At the tournament, Nkufo played an influential role in helping the Swiss upset eventual world champions Spain in the group stage.

International goals
Scores and results list Switzerland's goal tally first, score column indicates score after each Nkufo goal.

Coaching career 
Nkufo owned the Nkufo Academy Sports in the Greater Vancouver area, is managing director of the Blaise Soccer Elite Training INC, and works as Head coach of Rino's Tigers in the Vancouver Metro Soccer League Premier Division.

Personal life 
Born in Kinshasa, Zaire, Nkufo emigrated to Switzerland with his family when he was seven and became naturalised as a Swiss citizen.

Nkufo is married to a woman from Vancouver, British Columbia.

Name confusion 
Nkufo has himself said in interviews that his surname is Nkufo. The incorrect version N'Kufo is often found in media. The surname is pronounced Kufo, without the N.

Honours
Twente
 Eredivisie: 2009–10

Seattle Sounders FC
 U.S. Open Cup: 2010

References 

1975 births
Living people
Swiss men's footballers
Association football forwards
FC Lausanne-Sport players
Grasshopper Club Zürich players
Yverdon-Sport FC players
FC Lugano players
FC Luzern players
1. FSV Mainz 05 players
Hannover 96 players
FC Twente players
Qatar Stars League players
Swiss Super League players
Bundesliga players
2. Bundesliga players
Eredivisie players
Switzerland international footballers
2010 FIFA World Cup players
Swiss expatriate footballers
Al-Arabi SC (Qatar) players
Democratic Republic of the Congo expatriate footballers
Democratic Republic of the Congo footballers
Swiss expatriate sportspeople in Germany
Democratic Republic of the Congo expatriate sportspeople in Germany
Swiss expatriate sportspeople in the Netherlands
Democratic Republic of the Congo expatriate sportspeople in the Netherlands
Expatriate footballers in Germany
Expatriate footballers in the Netherlands
Democratic Republic of the Congo emigrants to Switzerland
Swiss people of Democratic Republic of the Congo descent
Naturalised citizens of Switzerland
Footballers from Kinshasa
Seattle Sounders FC players
Expatriate soccer players in the United States
Major League Soccer players
Designated Players (MLS)